Henning Solvang (born 1974) (Doom Perignon) is a Norwegian rock musician and member of the rock bands Thulsa Doom and Brut Boogaloo. Henning is now a teacher at "Hauketo skole" in Oslo, Norway, teaching history, geography and music. He is well known in the Norwegian rock community. He has been a member of several rockbands since 2001, and has been a collaborator on 12 albums with several bands. Henning has played in the well known Øyafestivalen in Norway in 2008. He got good reviews  from NRK (National broadcasting network in Norway) when playing with Brut Boogaloo for their new album Dirty Living. During the Norwegian music contest, Melodi Grand Prix the competition that decides which person or band who will be nominated for Eurovision Song Contest, Henning was a member of the national jury with 50% power to decide, along with the votes of the country.

His song "Learn from TV" has been used in the television series Mammon.

Discography

References

Living people
Norwegian musicians
1974 births